When We On is the name of a Crazy Penis album produced in 2011.

Track listing

"Open For Service" - 6:47
"Changes" - 5:37
"Beatbox" - 7:59
"The Unbearable Lightness of Being" - 4:28
"Heartbreaker" - 5:27
"Twisted" - 9:12
"Sonar" - 6:09
"Your Dark Energy" - 6:02
"Eruption" - 6:05
"Wecanonlybewhoweare" - 6:12
"Future Beat" - 5:55

2011 albums